Mt. Eden Cemetery is a cemetery in Hayward, California, in the area formerly called "Mt. Eden". The site was first established in 1860 as a pioneer cemetery. It is still in use. As of 2005, there were over 2,800 records (gravesites).

References

External links

 Mt. Eden Cemetery history
 
 

Cemeteries in Hayward, California
1860 establishments in California